Anna Ramírez may refer to:
 Anna Ramírez (beach volleyball)
 Anna Ramírez (cyclist)

See also
 Ana Ramírez (disambiguation)